"Whenever You Call" refers to any of the following songs or singles:

 "Whenever You Call", a 1997 song by Mariah Carey and Brian McKnight included in Carey's album Butterfly
 "Whenever You Call", a 2006 song by Jolina Magdangal included in her album Tuloy Pa Rin Ang Awit
 "Whenever You Call" (Arashi song), a 2020 song released as a non-album single by Arashi